Mazurkiewicz, Mazurkievič, or Mazurkievich is a surname with variants in a number of languages. It is derived from mazurek. The surname is found across Poland. Related surnames include Mazurek and Mazur.

People 
 Antoni Mazurkiewicz, computer scientist, inventor of the trace theory
 Jan Mazurkiewicz (1896-1988), Polish underground soldier during WW2 and later a general
 Ladislao Mazurkiewicz (1945-2013), Uruguayan football goalkeeper
 Paul Mazurkiewicz (born 1968), drummer of the band Cannibal Corpse
 Stefan Mazurkiewicz (1888-1945), Polish mathematician
 Tomasz Mazurkiewicz (born 1981), Polish footballer
 Władysław Mazurkiewicz (1871-1933), Polish physician
 Władysław Mazurkiewicz (1911-1945), Polish serial killer

References 

Polish-language surnames